The Impact World Tag Team Championship (formerly known as the TNA World Tag Team Championship) is a professional wrestling championship contested for in Impact Wrestling's tag team division. After the formation of TNA in June 2002, the company executives signed a contractual agreement with the National Wrestling Alliance (NWA) that allowed them control of the NWA World Heavyweight and World Tag Team Championships. TNA subsequently changed their name to NWA–TNA, making them an official member of the NWA in the process. In May 2007, the NWA ended their five-year partnership with TNA, and thus regained control of the NWA World Heavyweight and World Tag Team Championships. As a result, TNA created the TNA World Heavyweight and World Tag Team Championships, which were unveiled on TNA's online podcast TNA Today on the May 15 and May 17, 2007 editions. In the respective editions, the championships were awarded to the last NWA champions under TNA banner by Jeremy Borash and TNA's primary authority figure Jim Cornette. The championship was officially presented to the public and awarded to the first official champions, Team 3D (Brother Devon and Brother Ray), on May 17. The championship was renamed to its current name in March 2017 when the promotion adopted its current name.

Title reigns are determined either by professional wrestling matches between different wrestlers involved in pre-existing scripted feuds, plots, and storylines, or by scripted circumstances. Wrestlers were portrayed as either villains or heroes as they followed a series of tension-building events, which culminated in a wrestling match or series of matches for the championship. Reigns that were won on episodes of TNA's primary television program, TNA Impact!, aired on television two to nine days from the date the match was taped. The inaugural champions were Team 3D, who were awarded the championship by being the last NWA World Tag Team Champions under TNA banner. The Wolves (Davey Richards and Eddie Edwards) and Beer Money, Inc. (Bobby Roode and James Storm) hold the record for most reigns as a team, with five. The longest reign as of July 2020 is 380 days by The North (Ethan Page and Josh Alexander), who set the record in their first reign.

Although the title is a World Tag Team Championship, supposedly only intended for tag teams, three different wrestlers have held the championship by themselves—Samoa Joe, Kurt Angle and Matt Morgan. Joe held the championship during his entire reign alone; however, Angle held the championship alone for 15 days until Sting won a match involving three other competitors to become Angle's partner and Morgan held the championship after (kayfabe) injuring his championship partner. Overall, there have been 65 reigns shared between 67 wrestlers and 43 teams. The current champions are Bullet Club (Ace Austin and Chris Bey) who are in their first reign both as a team and individually.

Title history

Names

Reigns 
For a list of world tag team champions in TNA between 2002 and 2007, see List of NWA World Tag Team Champions.

Combined reigns

By team

By wrestler

Notes

See also 
 List of current champions in Impact Wrestling
 Championships in Impact Wrestling

References
General

Specific

External links
Impact World Tag Team Championship

Professional wrestling tag team champion lists
Impact Wrestling champions lists